The Hellenic Olympic Committee (HOC) is the governing Olympic body of Greece. It is the second oldest National Olympic Committee in the world (after the French Olympic Committee), it organizes the country's representatives at the Olympic Games and other multi-sport events.

Members of the committee are 27 sports federations, which elect the Executive Council composed of the president and six members.

It is based in Athens, Greece.

History
The history of the Hellenic Olympic Committee is strongly connected to the history of the revival of the Olympic Games. It was founded in Athens on February 3, 1894, with the name Committee of the Olympic Games (E.O.A.) and became a member of the International Olympic Committee in 1895. E.O.A organized 1896 Summer Olympics, first in modern history, in restored Panathenaic Stadium, who was held from 6 to 15 April.

In 1899, the Greek government gave to E.O.A. full responsibility to cooperate with other sport federations, spreads the Olympic spirit and its structure of the 12 members, led by the president.

When Athens was chosen as the host city of the 2004 Summer Olympics during the 106th IOC Session held in Lausanne on 5 September 1997, in 2000 the E.O.A. changed its name to the Hellenic Olympic Committee.

From the I Mediterranean Games in Alexandria in 1951, Hellenic Olympic Committee is responsible for their holding every four years as part of preparations for the Olympic Games.

The HOC organises the lighting ceremony of the Olympic flame in Ancient Olympia for ceremonies of the Summer and Winter Olympic Games, as well as the Olympic torch relay over Greece, before the Flame continues its journey in the host country of the Olympic Games.

List of presidents

IOC Members

Executive committee
The committee of the HOC is represented by: 
 President: Spyros Capralos
 Vice President: Stelios Aggeloudis
 Secretary General: Emmanuel Kolympadis
 Treasurer: Antonis Nikolopoulos
 Members: Aristidis Adamopoulos, Polyxeni Argeitaki, Ioannis Karras, Nikos Iatrou

Member federations
The Hellenic National Federations are the organizations that coordinate all aspects of their individual sports. They are responsible for training, competition and development of their sports. There are currently 26 Olympic Summer and one Winter Sport Federations in Greece.

Objects of the HOC
The Hellenic Olympic Committee operates a number of sports facilities: Panathenaic Stadium, Karaiskakis Stadium, Athens Olympic Aquatic Centre, the education facilities of the International Olympic Academy, Museum of Modern Olympic Games in Ancient Olympia; and participates in the management of OAKA.

See also
Greece at the Olympics

References

External links
Official website

Greece at the Olympics
National Olympic Committees
Olympic
1894 establishments in Greece
Sports organizations established in 1894